Da Col is an Italian surname. Notable people with the surname include:

 Alessandro da Col (born 1978), retired Italian tennis player
 Bruno Da Col (1913–1995), Italian ski jumper

See also 

 Col (disambiguation)
 De Col

Italian-language surnames